Roemheld syndrome (RS), or gastrocardiac syndrome, or gastric cardiac syndrome or Roemheld–Techlenburg–Ceconi syndrome or gastric-cardia, was a medical syndrome first coined by Ludwig von Roemheld (1871–1938) describing a cluster of cardiovascular symptoms stimulated by gastrointestinal changes. Although it is currently considered an obsolete medical diagnosis, recent studies have described similar clinical presentations and highlighted potential underlying mechanisms.

Symptoms and signs
Symptoms can be as follows. They are periodic, and occur only during an "episode", usually after eating.
 Sinus bradycardia
 Difficulty inhaling
 Angina pectoris
 Left ventricular discomfort
 Premature heart beats (PVC / PAC)
 Tachycardia
 Fatigue
 Anxiety
 Uncomfortable breathing
 Poor perfusion
 Muscle pain (crampiness)
 Burst or sustained vertigo or dizziness
 Sleep disturbance (particularly when sleeping within a few hours of eating, or lying on the left side)
 Hot flashes

Mechanical
Mechanically induced Roemheld syndrome is characterized by pressure in the epigastric and left hypochondriac region. Often the pressure is in the fundus of the stomach, esophagus or distention of the bowel. It is believed this leads to elevation of the diaphragm, and secondary displacement of the heart. This reduces the heart's ability to fill and increases the contractility of the heart to maintain homeostasis.

Neurological
The cranium dysfunction mechanical changes in the gut can compress the vagus nerve at any number of locations along the vagus, slowing the heart. As the heart slows, autonomic reflexes are triggered to increase blood pressure and heart rate.

This is complemented by gastro-coronary reflexes whereby the coronary arteries constrict with "functional cardiovascular symptoms" similar to chest-pain on the left side and radiation to the left shoulder, dyspnea, sweating, up to angina pectoris-like attacks with extrasystoles, drop of blood pressure, and tachycardia (high heart rate) or sinus bradycardia (heart rate below 60 bpm). Typically, there are no changes/abnormalities related in the EKG detected. This can actually trigger a heart attack for persons with cardiac structural abnormalities i.e. coronary bridge, missing coronary, and atherosclerosis.

If the heart rate drops too low for too long, catecholamines are released to counteract any lowering of blood pressure. Catecholamines bind to alpha receptors and beta receptors, decreasing vasodilation and increasing contractility of the heart. Sustaining this state causes heart fatigue which results in fatigue and chest pain.

Causes
 Gastroesophageal reflux disease
 Excessive gas in the transverse colon caused by:
 Lactose intolerance
 Abnormal gall bladder function and/or blood flow
 Gall stones
 Sphincter of Oddi dysfunction
 Hiatal hernia
 Cardiac bridge (Coronary occluding reflexes triggered by coronary reflexes)
 Enteric disease
 Aneructonia, the loss of the ability to belch (continuous or intermittent) 
 Bowel obstruction (Less common, this usually leads to intense pain in short time)
 Acute pancreatic necrosis

Diagnosis

There is significant scope of misdiagnosis of Roemheld syndrome. Diagnosis of Roemheld syndrome usually starts with a cardiac workup, as the gastric symptoms may go unnoticed, the cardiac symptoms are scary and can be quite severe. After an EKG, Holter monitor, tilt test, cardiac MRI, cardiac CT, heart catheterization, EP study, echo-cardiogram, and extensive blood work, and possibly a sleep study, a cardiologist may rule out a heart condition.

Often a psych workup may ensue as a conversion disorder may be suspected in the absence of heart disease, or structural heart abnormalities.

Diagnosis is often made based on symptoms in the absence of heart abnormalities. A gastroenterologist will perform a colonoscopy, endoscopy, and ultrasound to locate or eliminate problems in the abdomen.

Determining the cause of Roemheld syndrome is still not an exact science. If you have an ultrasound or sleep study, ensure that you know how to reproduce the symptoms, as it is difficult to detect any abnormalities when symptoms have subsided.

Treatment
Treatment of the primary gastroenterological distress is the first concern, mitigation of gastric symptoms will also alleviate cardiac distress.
 Anticholinergics, magnesium, or sodium (to raise blood pressure) supplements
 Anticonvulsants have eliminated all symptoms in some Roemheld syndrome sufferers; Lorazepam, Oxcarbazepine increase GI motility, reduce vagus "noise" (sodium channel blocking believed to contribute to positive effects)
 Alpha blockers may increase gi motility if that is an issue, also 5 mg to 10 mg amitriptyline if motility is an issue that can't be solved by other methods
 Antigas - simethicone, beano, omnimax reduces epigastric pressure
 Antacids - calcium carbonate, famotidine, omeprazole, etc. reduces acid reflux in the case of hiatal hernia or other esophageal type Roemheld syndrome.
 Vagotomy
 Beta blockers - reduces contractility and automaticity of the heart which reduces irregular rhythms but also lowers blood pressure when symptoms occur, and further reduces perfusion ex: Carvedilol, this will control abnormal heart rhythms, but can precipitate Prinzmetal angina and heart block.

Etiology
Roemheld syndrome is characterized strictly by abdominal maladies triggering reflexes in the heart. There are a number of pathways through which cardiac reflexes can occur: hormones, mechanical, neurological and immunological.

History
Ludwig Roemheld characterized this particular syndrome shortly before his death; one of his research topics around this time was the effects of calorie intake on the heart. In Elsevier publications, there is no current research or publishing under the name Roemheld syndrome, and as a result, many cases go undiagnosed. German publishing on the subject remains untranslated as of 2009.

See also
 Swallowing syncope

References

Syndromes
Heart diseases
Digestive diseases